Panskura Lok Sabha constituency was one of the 543 parliamentary constituencies in India. The constituency centred on Panskura in West Bengal.

Assembly segments
Prior to delimitation in 2006 Panskura Lok Sabha constituency was composed of the following assembly segments: 
  Daspur (assembly constituency no. 198)
  Nandanpur (assembly constituency no. 199)
  Panskura West (assembly constituency no. 200)
  Sabang (assembly constituency no. 216)
  Pingla (assembly constituency no. 217)
  Debra (assembly constituency no. 218)
  Keshpur (SC) (assembly constituency no. 219)

As per order of the Delimitation Commission issued in 2006 in respect of the delimitation of constituencies in the West Bengal, Panskura parliamentary constituency will cease to exist; most of the assembly segments of this constituency will be part of new Ghatal Lok Sabha constituency.

Members of Parliament

Members of Parliament

For Members of Parliament from the area during the period 1951-1977 and 2009 onwards see Ghatal Lok Sabha constituency

Election results
Most of the contests were multi-cornered. However, only winners and runners-up are mentioned below:

Ghatal Lok Sabha constituency functioned from 1951 to 1971.

General election 2004

2000 Bye-election
In the Panskura seat, the by-election was held due to the death of the sitting CPI-MP Geeta Mukherjee on 4 March 2000.
The bye election held on 5 June 2000. Bikram Sarkar of Trinamool Congress defeated Gurudas Dasgupta of the CPI by 41,491 votes.

General election 1999

General election 1998

General election 1996

General election 1991

General election 1989

General election 1984

General election 1980

General election 1977

See also
 List of Constituencies of the Lok Sabha

References

Former Lok Sabha constituencies of West Bengal
Politics of Purba Medinipur district
Former constituencies of the Lok Sabha
2008 disestablishments in India
Constituencies disestablished in 2008